Sigrid Fick (née Frenckell; 28 March 1887 – 4 June 1979) was a Finnish-born tennis player who moved to Sweden in 1910. She competed at the 1912, 1920 and 1924 Olympics and won two mixed doubles medals in 1912, both with Gunnar Setterwall. During her career Fick won 56 Swedish titles.

References

External links
 
 

1887 births
1979 deaths
Sportspeople from Helsinki
People from Uusimaa Province (Grand Duchy of Finland)
Swedish-speaking Finns
Finnish people of German descent
Swedish female tennis players
Tennis players at the 1912 Summer Olympics
Tennis players at the 1920 Summer Olympics
Tennis players at the 1924 Summer Olympics
Olympic tennis players of Sweden
Olympic silver medalists for Sweden
Olympic bronze medalists for Sweden
Olympic medalists in tennis
Medalists at the 1912 Summer Olympics